The Metropolitan Elevated Railway can refer to one of:
The IRT Sixth Avenue Line, a former elevated railway in New York City, or
The Metropolitan West Side Elevated Railroad, a former elevated railway in Chicago that was ancestral to the modern-day Blue Line and Pink Line